Guy Rolland N'Dy Assembé (born 28 February 1986) is a Cameroonian professional footballer who plays as a goalkeeper.

Club career
N'Dy Assembé arrived in France from Cameroon at the age of two. When he was six he started playing for amateur team ASPTT Nantes as a defender. At age fourteen he asked to change role to goalkeeper, and after a year of this position he was spotted by FC Nantes recruiter Vincent Bracigliano. He made his league debut for Nantes on 25 February 2008 in the Ligue 2 match at Sedan.

In August 2009 he joined Ligue 1 side FC Valenciennes on a season-long loan, with an option to buy. Despite being signed as a third, or rotating second-choice, he made 17 league starts for Valenciennes during the season, due to a serious injury to first-choice Nicolas Penneteau. He returned to Nantes after his loan, and was first choice during the 2010–11 Ligue 2 season.

In July 2011 he made a million-euro transfer to AS Nancy in Ligue 1. He made his debut for the club in the fifth match of the 2011–12 Ligue 1 season, on 11 September 2011, in a 0–0 draw against Auxerre. He went on to make

At the end of the 2012–13 season, with Nancy relegated to Ligue 2, he returned to Ligue 1 on a season-long loan with Guingamp.  He returned to Nancy and went on to play 139 league games for the club, including 36 in the 2015–16 Ligue 2 championship season, before leaving at the end of the 2018–19 season, when his contract expired.

After six months without a club, he joined US Boulogne in January 2020.

International career
N'Dy Assembé was first called up to the Cameroon national football team in December 2009, as part of the 23-man squad for 2010 Africa Cup of Nations. He retained his position for the 2010 FIFA World Cup, and made his international debut in a warm-up friendly against Georgia on 25 May 2010.

He was also selected as part of the squad for the 2015 Africa Cup of Nations.

Honours
Guingamp
 Coupe de France: 2013–14
Nancy
 Ligue 2: 2015–16

References

External links
Profile at francefootball.fr 

1986 births
Living people
Association football goalkeepers
Cameroonian footballers
Cameroon international footballers
2010 Africa Cup of Nations players
2010 FIFA World Cup players
FC Nantes players
Valenciennes FC players
AS Nancy Lorraine players
En Avant Guingamp players
US Boulogne players
US Hostert players
Ligue 1 players
Ligue 2 players
Championnat National players
Luxembourg National Division players
Cameroonian expatriate footballers
Expatriate footballers in France
Cameroonian expatriate sportspeople in France
Expatriate footballers in Luxembourg
Cameroonian expatriate sportspeople in Luxembourg
2015 Africa Cup of Nations players